Kilkenny West, previously Maherquirke or  Dillons country, is a barony in west County Westmeath, Ireland. It was formed by 1542. It is bordered by County Longford to the west; it is also bordered by three other Westmeath baronies: Rathconrath (to the east), Brawny (to the south-west) and Clonlonan (to the south-east). The largest centre of population in the barony is the village of Glassan.

Geography
The barony contains part of the second largest lake on the River Shannon, Lough Ree. The N55 national secondary road connecting Athlone to Cavan passes through the barony.

Civil parishes of the barony 
This table lists an historical geographical sub-division of the barony known as the civil parish (not to be confused with an Ecclesiastical parish).

Towns, villages and townlands
Ballykeeran, a small village located on the N55 national secondary road north of Athlone.
Drumraney, a village just off the R390 regional road.

Tang, a village on the N55 between Athlone and Ballymahon.
The Pigeons, an area on the N55 between Tubberclare and Tang.
Tubberclare, a large parish and townland,  from Athlone, on the N55.

There are 136 townlands in the barony of Kilkenny West.

References

External links
Map of the barony of Kilkenny West at openstreetmap.org
Barony of Kilkenny West, County Westmeath at townlands.ie

Baronies of County Westmeath